Kicko & Super Speedo is an Indian action-comedy animated series that airs on Indian pay television channel Sony Yay. The show is produced by Green Gold Animations and all of its episodes are directed by Rishi Chadha and they are written by Amit Senchoudhary.

Plot 
The series, set in Sun City, revolves around Kicko and his supercar, Super Speedo. They fight against villains who cause harm to Sun City. Kicko's rivalry is with Tony whose sidekicks are Roll no.4 and Roll no.20. His friends are Dodo and Twinkle. Kicko's kicks and Super Speedo's speed make everything fine.

Characters 

Kicko: He is a 6-year-old boy who fights against villains with the help of Super Speedo. His kicks are very powerful, but he doesn't use them until the situation is out of control. His friends are Dodo and Twinkle, while his rival is Tony. He wears a hi-tech wristwatch called R7. The danger light of R7 will blink when there is a danger. He also says 'jahaan trick chal jaaye, vahaan kick ki kya zaroorat hai' when he wants to trick Tony and his sidekicks or bad guys instead of kicking them. Sometimes, he calls 'buddy' to Super Speedo. He wears a green T-shirt with a picture of a flaming 'O'.

Super Speedo: He is a red-colored supercar with many innovative gadgets. He is made up of laser lights. He helps Kicko in defeating villains. His wheels have multiple nozzles that emit fire to make him speeder. He emerges from R7 when Kicko says 'raftaar pe raftaar, R7 se nikle Super Speedo car'. He goes back to R7 when Kicko says 'tham jaaye raftaar, R7 me samaa jaaye Super Speedo car'. He is also a rapper. He also calls 'buddy' to Kicko sometimes.

Dodo: He is a 6-year-old friend of Kicko who loves eating so much. He wears a backwards baseball cap. When he hears something, he thinks about eating something. He even eats or gets lost in his dreams when there is danger in Sun City.

Twinkle: She is a 5-year-old friend of Kicko.  She wears a pink-colored LED wristwatch. She is small but shows courage. She is a living encyclopedia. She is the only female character in the series.

Tempo Anna: He is a mechanic. He impresses Kicko and his friends when he plays with his hand tool and does something amazing in his style. He has a pure black mustache.

Tony: He is an 8-year old rival of Kicko. His sidekicks are Roll No. 4 and Roll No. 20, who make funny rhymes about him. After his sidekicks tease him, he punches them and says 'Tony ka mukka'.

Roll No. 4 and Roll No. 20: They are the identical sidekicks of Tony. They tease him by making funny rhymes. After Tony says 'Tony ka mukka', they say 'hud hud hukka'. Roll no.4 wears a maroon T-shirt and Roll no.20 wears a yellow T-shirt.

Mayor: He is the mayor of Sun City. He lives in a big bungalow. Kicko and his friends call him 'Mayor Uncle'. His name is not mentioned.

Professor Khurana: He is a scientist. He sometimes invents something that creates trouble. He is seen only in some episodes and has an assistant named Dr. Dhingra, who only appeared in two episodes.

Jasoos Jhatpat: He is a detective and spy. He speaks in a code language which his assistant can only understand. After the criminal is caught, he speaks in that same language. His assistant understands it and says 'Sir Keh Rahe Hain Ki You Are Under Arrest.

Games

Merge Super Speedo
This game was made by Zapak and is available on Play Store. It is based on Kicko & Super Speedo.

Kicko and Super Speedo
This game is an endless running game and it is also made by Zapak. It is also based on Kicko & Super Speedo and it is also available on Play Store.

Movies
Kicko and Super Speedo: Return of the Devils
Kicko and Super Speedo vs Benaam Woh
Kicko and Super Speedo vs Shrinko
Kicko and Super Speedo: Future Man Attacks
Kicko and Super Speedo: The Real Heroes

References

See also
List of Indian animated television series
Green Gold Animations
Sony Yay

2018 Indian television series debuts
2018 Indian television series endings
Indian children's animated action television series
Indian children's animated comedy television series
Sony Yay original programming
Animated television series about children
Indian children's animated science fantasy television series
Indian children's animated superhero television series